Ramdev (born Ram Kisan Yadav between 1965 and 1975), also referred to by his followers with the honorifics Baba or Swami, is an Indian yoga guru, businessman and brand ambassador for Patanjali Ayurved. Ramdev is primarily known for being a proponent of yoga and ayurveda in India. Ramdev has been organizing and conducting large yoga camps since 2002, broadcasting his yoga classes on various TV channels. He co-founded Patanjali Ayurved and Patanjali Yogpeeth with his colleague Balkrishna in 2006. Ramdev has received criticism over his comments related to modern medicine, yoga, and ayurveda.

Ramdev is aligned with the Bharatiya Janata Party (BJP) on a number of issues. He has led protests against corruption in India and has advocated for the repatriation of black money held in foreign banks. In April 2022, Ramdev was ranked the 78th most powerful Indian by The Indian Express.

Early life and education
Ramdev, originally named Ramkishan Yadav, was born between 1965 and 1975 in Alipur  in Haryana.  He was born to Ram Niwas and Gulabo Devi, who were poor illiterate farmers. He has an older brother, a younger brother, and a younger sister. Since childhood, the left side of his face has been partly paralysed perhaps owing to a congenital disability or a childhood illness.

Yadav initially attended a government school at Shahzadpur till the eighth standard. The government school consisted of an english medium curriculum introduced by Babington Macaulay.  At a young age, Yadav was drawn to the writings by Dayanand Saraswati, specifically Satyarth Prakash which led him to leave his government school to pursue a gurukula At around nine years old, he pursued study in Khanpur at a gurukula system. Yadav attended Arsh Gurukul Mahavidyalaya between 1984 until 1989. At fourteen, he moved to Kalwa to attend a gurukula and studied under one of his principal gurus, Acharya Baldevji. This is where he met Balkrishna as a fellow student. In Kalwa, he studied the Sanskrit language and literature, Hindu philosophical and religious texts, and traditions of yoga and asceticism. While living in Kalwa, he offered free yoga training to villagers. 

After completing his studies in 1992, Yadav traveled to Haridwar to stay at the Kripalu Bagh Ashram under the guidance of Shankardevi Maharaj. At Kripalu Bagh Ashram, he learned yoga from Acharya Karamveer, also an Arya Samaj. Yadav took vows of renunciation, adopted sannyasa, and took the name Ramdev. Ramdev and Karamveer held yoga camps throughout India and sold chawanprash in Haridwar together.

On 5 January 1995, Balkrishna, Ramdev, and Acharya Karamveer founded Divya Yoga Mandir Trust, which was set up at the Kripalu Bagh Ashram in Haridwar. Under the Divya Yoga Mandir Trust, they offered yoga camps and established an Ayurvedic pharmacy.

Patanjali

Patanjali Ayurved 

Patanjali Ayurved is a consumer packaged goods company, based in Haridwar, that was started by Ramdev and Balkrishna in 2006. The company is one of the highest grossing FMCG's in India. In FY22, Patanjali Ayurved posted revenues of Rs 10,664.46 crore. Balkrishna serves as the CEO of Patanjali Ayurved with 95% ownership and supervises its day-to-day activities, while Ramdev serves as the face of the company and makes most of the business decisions.

Ramdev has advocated for Indian nationalism in the tradition of the swadeshi movement through the production and sale of Patanjali Ayurved products and he has encouraged Indian citizens to reject multinational brands.

Members of Ramdev's family relocated to Haridwar and several have participated in his business ventures. His father has overseen some activities at Patanjali Ayurved. His younger brother Ram Bharat has been described as the company's de facto CEO.

Ramdev declared net worth of his personal assets at around "₹1,100 crore" in 2013.

The company has been accused of creating misleading advertisements about its products and conducting insufficient testing before launching products in the marketplace. Some products like amla juice have been banned from sales due to poor quality by Indian government. Patanjali has also been surrounded by controversies regarding working conditions where Ramdev and Balkrishna are treated like gurus whose feet must be touched each time they enter an area. Factory workers are paid a salary of Rs 6000 per month while working 12-hour shifts, six days a week. They are also discouraged to ask for a raise as working at factory is considered "seva" (voluntary service) to the cause.

In May 2018, Ramdev launched Swadeshi Samriddhi SIM cards in partnership with BSNL.

Patanjali Yogpeeth 

Patanjali Yogpeeth is an institute founded for the promotion and practice of Yoga and Ayurveda. It has two Indian campuses, Patanjali Yogpeeth I and Patanjali Yogpeeth II in Haridwar, Uttarakhand. Other locations include UK, US, Nepal, Canada and Mauritius.  Ramdev is the Vice-Chancellor of the Patanjali Yogpeeth.  In 2006, Ramdev established a registered charity in the UK known as the Patanjali Yog Peeth (UK) Trust, which had the stated objective of supporting Patanjali Yogpeeth (India) through the promotion of Ayurveda and pranayama yoga in the UK. To extend Patanjali Yogpeeth, he also acquired the Scottish island of Little Cumbrae. In 2012, Ramdev established the Divya Yog Pharmacy in Haridwar.

In 2017, the Income Tax Appellate Tribunal (ITAT) through its Delhi bench gave tax exempt status to Patanjali Yogpeeth.

In March 2018, 92 scholars of various different castes and backgrounds were initiated by Ramdev as sanyasis, or renunciants, at the Patanjali Yogpeeth in Haridwar. In 2022, Ramdev announced that sanyasis will serve as trustees of the Patanjali Yogpeeth and Divya Yoga Mandir. The sanyasis initiated by Ramdev studied Hindu scriptures for at least seven years at Patanjali Yogpeeth and a number of them have advanced degrees from universities.

Social and political activities

Social engagement 
In 2006, Ramdev was invited by Kofi Annan to deliver a lecture on poverty alleviation at a United Nations conference. In October 2014, he was one of the nine personalities invited by the Prime Minister Modi to participate and promote the message of cleanliness when Swachh Bharat Mission was launched.

Bharat Swabhiman
In 2010, Ramdev announced plans to form a political party. In 2011, he stated that he did not have political ambitions, and instead of forming a political party, would focus on fighting against nationwide corruption. In 2014, Ramdev announced that Bharat Swabhiman would contest some constituencies in the general election of that year and form alliances with some other parties. It was at this time that he voiced his support for Narendra Modi to become the next Prime Minister of India, and signed nine pledges with BJP leaders on institutional and cultural reforms. The Gujarat High Court allowed the Trust to hold yoga camps in 2014 as long as the camps were not political in nature.

In 2014, the Bharat Swabhiman Trust, Divya Yog Mandir Trust, and Patanjali Yogpeeth Trust were under scrutiny by the ECI for allegedly funding election expenses for political parties.

Campaigns against corruption 

In April 2011, Ramdev called on the government to add punitive powers to the Jan Lokpal Bill, a bill to appoint an independent body to investigate alleged government corruption. Relatedly, Ramdev announced he would go on an anshan hunger strike at Ramlila Ground in Delhi, on 4 June 2011, to pressure the government to root out corruption and repatriate black money. A week before the scheduled fast, the government set up a committee, headed by the chairman of the Central Board of Direct Taxes, to suggest steps to curb black money and its transfer abroad. Talks continued between the two sides and, on 3 June, both sides claimed that a consensus had been reached on most issues. However, in the evening, Ramdev announced that he would still carry on with his hunger strike.

During the first day of the strike, government minister Kapil Sibal publicized a letter from Ramdev's camp stating that the hunger strike would end if the government honoured its commitments. Ramdev took it as a betrayal by the government and hardened his position.

Shortly before midnight on the first day, a Delhi police spokesman announced that permission for the gathering had been revoked because permission was only granted for a 5,000 person yoga camp, and not for a protest of 50,000 people. At midnight, over 5,000 police officers disrupted the protest and used Tear gas shells and a lathicharge to drive away protesters. Ramdev tried to escape capture by disguising himself in women's clothes but was eventually arrested and flown back to his ashram in Haridwar and banned from entering Delhi for 15 days.  On reaching Haridwar, Ramdev told reporters that his fast was not over yet and he would continue with his satyagraha civil resistance.

Police reported that 53 citizens and ten police members were injured and treated in hospitals. There were accusations that women protesters had been badly treated by the police, who alleged that they had objects thrown at them by protesters. One female protester suffered a spinal injury and later died in a hospital from cardiac arrest. In a statement, Ramdev highlighted her sacrifice and noted that they would honor her by fighting against corruption in India.

Aftermath of the Delhi protest 
Ramdev accused the government of cheating him, and alleged that there was a conspiracy to kill him. Leaders of the BJP said that the police action had been a shameful chapter in the democracy of this country. BJP leader LK. Advani called it naked fascism. India's Supreme Court asked the government for an explanation.

Ramdev was supported by civil society activists as well. Activist Anna Hazare called the crackdown a "strangulation of democracy".  Hazare indicated that the action could have been compared to the Jallianwala Bagh massacre if the policed had fired ammunition. Thousands of supporters in other cities continued their fast in protest.

Ramdev ended his fast on the ninth day, after being hospitalised two days earlier. His decision to end the protest was welcomed by politicians from the BJP, Janata Party and Congress Party.

Ambedkar stadium fast movement
As a part of the "India against corruption" movement, Ramdev launched another indefinite protest on 10 August 2012 against the government's failure to act against corruption and repatriate money. He announced that his future strategy depended upon the government's response to his protest. Ramdev ended the fast at Delhi's Ambedkar Stadium on 14 August 2012, and announced he was returning to Haridwar. At Ambedkar, Ramdev said, "we are leaving because we won."

Television 
Ramdev began appearing on TV as a yoga guru in 2002, first with Sanskar TV.  The following year, in 2003, Aastha TV began featuring him in its morning yoga slot. He proved to be telegenic and gained a large following. A large number of people, including some celebrities from India and abroad, attended his Yoga camps. He taught students in foreign countries including the United Kingdom, the United States, and Japan. He also addressed Muslim clerics at their seminary in Deoband, Uttar Pradesh in 2009. At Yog Gram, his main yoga centre, Ramdev practices and teaches yoga in an auditorium, for TV broadcast. In 2017, he was also a judge of a reality show entitled, "Om Shanti Om," where contestants sang devotional songs.

Controversies

Labour law violations and animal contents

In March 2005, 115 employees of Divya Yoga Mandir Trust began a protest for minimum wages and employees' rights, such as coverage under the Provident Fund and Employees' State Insurance Corporation. Management agreed to pay minimum wage and not initiate disciplinary actions against the employees protesting and, in turn, the employees agreed that they would restore normalcy in the workplace. However, the Trust refused to take back some of the employees, accusing them of committing sabotage. Their case was taken up by the Centre of Indian Trade Unions CITU, affiliated with the Communist Party of India Marxist CPI(M).

Brinda Karat, a senior figure in the CPI(M), took up the cause of the dismissed employees. They indicated that human bones and animal parts were used in some herbal medicines manufactured by Divya Pharmacy, which is owned by Divya Yog Mandir Trust. The dismissed employees provided samples that were tested at government laboratories, where the presence of animal materials in the sample was confirmed. However, the source of the samples was disputed, since they had been given to Karat by the protesting employees and not procured by government officials. Karat produced what were claimed to be the prescription and cash receipts for the samples, which were obtained from the Trust's hospital medicine counter. Ramdev denied the results and further testing conflicted with the previous tests. He received support from politicians, such as Sharad Pawar. Karat received a legal notice on behalf of a BJP leader in Faridabad, ordering her to apologize publicly or face legal action.

Rajiv Dixit

Rajiv Dixit, Ramdev's advisor, died of a cardiac arrest on 30 November 2010 in Bhilai, Chhattisgarh. Ramdev was alleged to have involvement in Dixit's death, however, he has denied any involvement.

Homosexuality 
In 2013, the Supreme Court of India upheld the constitutionality of Section 377, which in part criminalized homosexuality. Following the verdict, Ramdev called homosexuality a bad addiction and claimed he can cure it by yoga.

Biography 
In 2017, the Dehli High Court temporarily blocked the sale of an unauthorized biography about Ramdev entitled, Godman to Tycoon: The Untold Story of Baba Ramdev, until disputed content about him deemed defamatory was removed. The court reversed their injunction in April 2018 and the book was released for sale.

Medicine

COVID-19 
Ramdev sparked several controversies related to diagnosing and curing COVID-19 at the beginning of the pandemic. He claimed that holding one's breath could help one diagnose the virus, and further claimed that mustard oil could treat the virus, both of which lacked scientific basis. In May 2021, he questioned the need for oxygen amongst COVID-19 patients, but later withdrew his remarks after facing criticism from doctors. But the back-handed apology did not last long as he again took a swipe at allopathy in an open letter, asking "If allopathy is so efficient, why do allopathic doctors fall ill and does allopathy have any medicine to ensure transition of a violent man into a decent one". Dr Jaswant of the Resident Doctors Association at AIIMS told that the “language of (Ramdev's) letter is not an apology”. Indian Medical Association's (IMA) national vice-president, Dr. Navjot Singh Dahiya, filed a police complaint against Ramdev for allegedly creating the wrong perception about treatments and for allegedly using defamatory and insulting language towards doctors.

In June 2020, Patanjali Ayurved announced a drug named Coronil for COVID-19 treatment, marketing it as a cure for COVID-19 patients. The day after the launch, a criminal complaint was filed against Ramdev and his partner, Balkrishna, in Muzaffarpur court by a social worker for misleading and putting the lives of a large number of people at risk. The Indian government allowed Patanjali Ayurved to market Coronil as an immunity booster but not a cure, banning it from selling as a COVID-19 cure. The Government of Maharashtra banned the sale of Coronil in the state, citing that the World Health Organisation had not certified the medicine. Lawsuits were filed in Bihar and Rajasthan against Ramdev, Balkrishna, and others, accusing them of cheating and selling fake medicines.  The Madras High Court fined the company  for "exploiting fear and panic among the general public by projecting a cure for the coronavirus." Patanjali withdrew the claim of Coronil being a cure for COVID-19. The UK drug regulator threatened action if the unauthorized products were sold in the UK market.

On 18 August 2022, Delhi High Court told Baba Ramdev not to mislead people against modern medicine after questioning the efficacy of COVID-19 vaccines and to avoid making any claims other than what is deemed official about Patanjali's Coronil.

Comments against modern medicine 
In late May 2021, Ramdev sparked a controversy when he claimed that modern medical science is a "stupid science" and that patients have died due to it. As a result, the IMA claimed that he was creating fear and frustration among the public to sell his drugs. The IMA also demanded the Union Health Minister Harsh Vardhan take action against Ramdev and prosecute him under the Epidemic Diseases Act, 1897 to save lives. The Delhi Medical Association demanded an FIR against him. Later, Patanjali's Balkrishna clarified that Ramdev has, "no ill-will against modern science and good practitioners of modern medicine". After facing pressure from the Health Minister, Ramdev eventually withdrew his comments and issued an apology.

Following the withdrawal, he posted 25 questions to IMA in an ‘open letter’ regarding treatments for several diseases. He courted sharp criticism from the medical community when he claimed that, "[d]octors should not fall ill at all if allopathy is all powerful and ‘sarvagun sampanna’ (having all good qualities)". IMA's Uttarakhand division sent a defamation notice to Ramdev and expressed that they would demand  if he didn't issue an apology. In a new video, he was seen reacting to the demand by saying, "even their father cannot arrest him".

During a yoga camp in Haridwar, Ramdev said several allopathy practitioners with MBBS and MD degrees were facing the side-effects of allopathy and are now turning towards yoga and ayurveda. He said his target would be to convert 1000 doctors to ayurveda within a year.

On 3 June 2021, the Delhi High Court refused to issue an injunction against Ramdev, noting that his comments fall under the right to freedom of speech and expression.

Controversial remarks 
In March 2017, Ramdev said at an event in Rohtak that he would have beheaded people who refused to chant Bharat Mata Ki Jai if there was no law, but  backtracked his statement a month later.

In November 2022, Ramdev made a sexist remark against women when he said, 'Women also look good when they wear nothing' and criticized women participants for not wearing sari at his Yoga event.

In February 2023, Ramdev said Muslims think offering prayers legitimize terrorism and abducting Hindu girls.

Awards and recognitions 
 January 2007 – Honorary Doctorate, by Kalinga Institute of Industrial Technology, Bhubaneswar, in recognition of his efforts to popularise the Vedic system/science of Yoga.
 July 2007 – Legislature of the U.S. State of New Jersey honored Ramdev for his commitment to improving health in mind, body and spirit and to enhancing the well-being of people from all social backgrounds.
 July 2007 – Some members of the British House of Commons hosted a reception for him.
 September 2007 – Felicitated by KL. Chugh, Chairman of ASSOCHAM at the 5th Global Knowledge Millennium Summit.
 January 2009 – Conferred with the title Mahamahopadhyaya by Rashtriya Sanskrit Vidyapeetha, Tirupati, Andhra Pradesh.
 January 2011 – Honoured with Sri Chandrashekharendra Saraswati National Eminence Award by Maharashtra Governor K. Shankaranarayanan.
 July 2012 – Honoured with Tarun Kranti Award at Ahmedabad in National Icon category by Narendra Modi, the current Prime Minister of India. The award is constituted by eminent Digambara Jain monk Tarunsagar.
January 2015 – Considered for Padma Vibushan, second highest civilian award but day before 66th Republic day, refrained from taking noting he is an ascetic.
April 2015 – Government of Haryana appointed Ramdev as brand ambassador of Yoga and Ayurveda. He was given the status of Cabinet minister for Haryana but he declined.
May 2016 American business magazine Fast Company ranked Ramdev 27th in its Most Creative Business People of 2016 list.
April 2017 – Magazine India Today ranked Ramdev #5th in India's 50 Most powerful people of 2017 list.
April 2022 – The Indian Express ranked Ramdev 78th in the list of 100 Most Powerful Indians in 2022 (IE 100).

Bibliography

In popular culture
Ramdev is being played by Kranti Prakash Jha in Swami Ramdev - Ek Sangharsh earlier aired on Discovery Jeet.

Patanajali Ayurveda Limited remains one of the top ten advertisers in India, and Ramdev's face has become ubiquitous.

Notes

References

Further reading

External links

 BBC Audio Interview with Swami Ramdev in Hindi
 BBC Interview with Swami Ramdev
 Yogi cleared of animal parts row – March 8, 2006 at BBC News

 
1965 births
Living people
20th-century Hindu religious leaders
21st-century Hindu religious leaders
Ayurvedacharyas
Gurukul Kangri University alumni
People from Haridwar
Indian Hindus
Indian yoga teachers
People from Mahendragarh
Swadeshi activists
Patanjali Ayurved
Modern yoga gurus